Ortaçeşme is a village in the Güney District of Denizli Province in Turkey.

References

Villages in Güney District